Shemshak is a city in Rudbar-e Qasran District of Shemiranat County, Tehran province, Iran. A suburb of Tehran, the city of Shemshak was formed from the former villages of Shemshak-e Bala, Shemshak-e Pain, Darband Sar, Sefidestan, Darrud, and Jirud. At the 2006 census, its population (as the total of the constituent villages) was 2,383 in 702 households. The following census in 2011 counted 1,901 people in 644 households. The latest census in 2016 showed a population of 3,423 people in 1,197 households, by which time the status of a city had been achieved.

References 

Shemiranat County

Cities in Tehran Province

Populated places in Tehran Province

Populated places in Shemiranat County

Ski areas and resorts in Iran